was a Japanese sprinter. She competed in the women's 100 metres at the 1932 Summer Olympics. She later married Olympic gold medallist Naoto Tajima. She died on 20 April 2008 in Kamakura.

References

External links
 

1914 births
2008 deaths
Athletes (track and field) at the 1932 Summer Olympics
Japanese female sprinters
Olympic athletes of Japan
Place of birth missing
Olympic female sprinters
20th-century Japanese women
21st-century Japanese women